Janmantar  was a popular Bengali television soap opera that premiered on June 6, 2011 and aired on Mahuaa Bangla. It was produced by Shree Venkatesh Films and stars Ayush Mukherjee as the male protagonist, Moumita Chowdhury as female protagonist and Swagata Mukherjee as female antagonist. Pradip Chakraborty, Ratna Ghoshal and Suchismita Chowdhury act in supporting roles

Plot summary 
The story revolves around Kadambadi Basu Thakur (Swagata Mukherjee), her grandson Prasun Basu Thakur (Ayush Mukherjee) and Tanaya Sanyal (Moumita Chowdhury). They are all trapped in a web of deception, conspiracy, murder and reincarnation. Prasun and Tanaya's previous life still haunts them in their present life.

Casts
 Ayush Mukherjee as Prasun Basu Thakur 
 Swagata Mukherjee as Kadambadi Basu Thakur 
 Moumita Chowdhury as Tanaya Sanyal
 Pradip Chakraborty as Fanibhushan
 Ratna Ghoshal 
 Suchismita Chowdhury

References

External links
DittoTV

2011 Indian television series debuts
Bengali-language television programming in India